"I'm Comin' Over" is a song co-written and recorded by American country music artist Chris Young.  It was released on May 11, 2015 as the lead single to his fifth studio album of the same name, which was released on November 13, 2015.  The song was written by Young, Corey Crowder and Josh Hoge.

Reception

Critical
The song received positive reviews from critics. Taste of Country reviewed the song positively, saying that "New Chris Young is doubling down on the traditional. "I’m Comin' Over" is drenched in weeping pedal steel and familiar country themes. The song relies on Young's sturdy voice, which is as solid as a mountain on this power ballad." In 2017, Billboard contributor Chuck Dauphin put "I'm Comin' Over" at number ten on his top 10 list of Young's best songs.

Commercial
"I'm Comin' Over" debuted on the Billboard Hot 100 at number 57 and Hot Country Songs at number 8 on its first week of release. It was the second best-selling country songs with 71,000 copies sold.  It became Young's sixth number one single on the Country Airplay chart dated November 28, 2015, and his first since "You" in February 2012. The song was certified Gold by the RIAA on September 23, 2015, and Platinum on January 11, 2016. It has sold 725,000 copies in the US as of February 2016.

Music video
The music video was directed by David McClister/Trey Fanjoy and premiered in May 2015.

Chart performance

Weekly chart

Year-end charts

Certifications

References

2015 songs
2015 singles
Country ballads
2010s ballads
Chris Young (musician) songs
RCA Records Nashville singles
Songs written by Corey Crowder (songwriter)
Songs written by Josh Hoge
Songs written by Chris Young (musician)